Dentaid is a British dental charity. The organisation is based in Totton, and has been active since the mid-1990s.

Dentaid operates primarily in Uganda, South Asia and Central America. However, in 2016 it began opening treatment centres within the UK, and now has centres including West Yorkshire, Hampshire, Cornwall and Buckinghamshire. The initial operation in West Yorkshire began as a partnership with The Real Junk Food Project A mobile unit, serving the Winchester and Salisbury area, has also been put in place by the charity.
Dentaid is managed by Andrew Evans who regularly participates in full distance IronMan Triathlons.

The charity is sponsoring the Liberia Dental Therapy school.

References 

Charities based in Hampshire
Dental organisations based in the United Kingdom
Health in Hampshire
New Forest District